A Licensed Insolvency Trustee (LIT) is a person licensed by the Superintendent of Bankruptcy in Canada to administer proposals and bankruptcies and manage assets held in trust. The trustee can give a debtor information and advice about both the proposal and bankruptcy processes and make sure that both the debtor’s rights and the creditor’s rights are respected. 

Technically, any Licensed Insolvency trustee in a province can help file for bankruptcy. All bankruptcy trustees in Canada are licensed by the Federal Government.

References
http://strategis.ic.gc.ca/eic/site/bsf-osb.nsf/eng/h_br01224.html

Insolvency law of Canada